Abdulsalam Suliyat Modasola well known as Liya, is a Nigerian singer, and songwriter.  She came into the music scene with the release of her first single under Davido Music Worldwide, titled "Melo", shortly after signing a record deal with the label in 2020. The accompanying music video for "Melo", was released on 8 December 2020, starring Davido, and directed by Dammy Twitch for DMW.

Early life
Abdulsalam Suliyat Modasola was born in Lagos around Ketu in 1999 and raised between Ketu and Alapere, then relocated with her parents to Ikorodu in 2011, where she attended Arabic school for her secondary education. Before gaining admission into the University of Ilorin in 2014, to study Yoruba Language, and bagged a Bachelor of Arts degree in Linguistics. Speaking with Wale Oloworekende, she said "I go to church with my parents sometimes because they had a lot of Christian friends. There was a Cherubim and Seraphim church behind my house, so I grew up around a lot of music. There were music classes at the Arabic school too. Subconsciously, I picked a lot of melodies from there."

Career
In 2020, she was introduced to the public through Davido's tweet, 5 hours after their meeting in the club through Peruzzi. On 14 September 2021, in an interview with OkayAfrica, Liya said "I played Davido a couple of my songs, including "Melo" and he was hooked, then he asked me and my manager to travel with him the next day to Abuja. During our trip, he started saying "first lady way", then took it to twitter." On 2 October 2020, Davido officially signed Liya, as the first female artist under his imprint Davido Music Worldwide. On 27 December 2020, Liya was cited as one of the 10 Nigerian Artistes To Watch by The Guardian Life magazine in 2021, curated by Chisom Njoku, and Asa Asika for The Guardian.

On 28 July 2021, she announced her first extended play Alari, to be released officially on 20 August 2021, through DMW. On 21 August 2021, music critic Motolani Alake said "her debut track titled "Melo," the mercurial singer flipped a sample of Angélique Kidjo's "Agolo" into a pop ditty pulsatin with regal grace.” during his first impression on the extended play, and called the project an "impressive debut EP". On 24 May 2022, she was nominated for The Headies in the Best Vocal Performance category for female, for the song "Alari". On 25 August 2021, she released the music video for "Adua", directed by Dammy Twitch, and went on to released "Adua (Remix)" with a guest appearance from Simi in 2022.

Artistry
Liya described her music genre as Afro-Fusion, and tells OkayAfrica It consists of a variety of influences that just comes out beautifully", she said. She also revealed her stage name Liya, which was picked out of her middle name Suliyat. Liya cited Angélique Kidjo, Aṣa, and Shola Allyson, as her musical influence or inspiration while growing up.

Discography
Studio album and EP

Alari - EP (2021)

Singles

Guest appearances

Accolades

References 

Living people
1999 births
English-language singers from Nigeria
21st-century Nigerian singers
Nigerian women singer-songwriters